George Charles Hurdman (September 23, 1870 – December 22, 1936) was a Canadian lumber merchant and political figure. He represented Ottawa West in the Legislative Assembly of Ontario from 1914 to 1919 as a Liberal member.

He was born in Ottawa, Ontario, the son of George Hurdman and Agnes Hurdman. He worked for several lumber firms before establishing his own company in 1899. In that same year, he married Katherine Lynton. Hurdman defeated the incumbent James A. Ellis to win a seat in the provincial assembly in 1914. He served in the local militia and was a lieutenant in the Princess Louise Dragoon Guards during World War I. He died in 1936.

References 

 Canadian Parliamentary Guide, 1916, EJ Chambers

External links 
Member's parliamentary history for the Legislative Assembly of Ontario
A cyclopædia of Canadian biography : brief biographies of persons ..., HW Charlesworth (1919) 

1870 births
1936 deaths
Canadian Methodists
Ontario Liberal Party MPPs
Politicians from Ottawa